The 2003–04 Bulgarian Cup was the 64th season of the Bulgarian Cup. Litex Lovech won the competition, beating CSKA Sofia 6–5 on penalties in the final at the Vasil Levski National Stadium in Sofia.

First round
In this round entered winners from the preliminary rounds together with the teams of B Group.

Second round
This round featured winners from the First Round and all teams of A Group. 

|-
!colspan=5 style="background-color:#D0F0C0;" |28 October / 12 November 2003

|-
!colspan=5 style="background-color:#D0F0C0;" |28 October / 13 November 2003

|}

Third round

First legs

Second legs

Quarter-finals

First legs

Second legs

Semi-finals

First legs

Second legs

Final

Details

Top scorers

References

2003-04
2003–04 domestic association football cups
Cup